Danish-Australian singer and songwriter Anja Nissen has released one studio album, two extended plays, nine singles (including two as featured artist) and four music videos.

Albums

Studio albums

Extended plays

Singles

As lead artist

As featured artist

Music videos

Guest appearances

References

Pop music discographies
Discographies of Australian artists
Discographies of Danish artists